Youth Brigade can refer to two different punk music groups:

Youth Brigade (band), from Los Angeles, California
Youth Brigade (Washington, D.C. band), from Washington, DC

Youth Brigade can refer to members of the 

National Youth Service (Zimbabwe).